Urotrachys is a genus of mites in the family Trachyuropodidae.

References

Mesostigmata
Articles created by Qbugbot